Coronation Street is a British soap opera, initially produced by Granada Television. Created by writer Tony Warren, Coronation Street first broadcast on ITV on 9 December 1960. The following is a list of characters introduced in the show's fourth year, by order of first appearance.

In April, outgoing series producer H.V. Kershaw saw the return of original cast member Philip Lowrie as Dennis Tanner after a year's absence. Kershaw vacated his position a month later, to be replaced by Margaret Morris — who in June secured a short return spot for David Barlow (Alan Rothwell), appearing in two episodes. Morris introduced two significant recurring characters in July, as Neil Crossley (Geoffrey Matthews) and Walter Potts (Christopher Sandford) made their first appearances, while Myra Booth (Susan Jameson) became the only new regular character to be introduced in 1963 when she arrived in September.

Myra's father George Dickenson (Stan Jay) followed her to Weatherfield in September, and Laurie Fraser (Stanley Meadows) began a five-month stint as a new love interest for Elsie Tanner in November. Jon Rollason also joined the cast as Dave Robbins in December.

Neil Crossley

Neil Crossley came to Weatherfield to take over as manager of Gamma Garments on Rosamund Street. He quickly caught the eye of Sheila Birtles, who was dating Jerry Booth at the time. Neil was unpopular with the locals, who believed he was no good, but Sheila was infatuated with him. After finding them together, Jerry fought with Neil and knocked him unconscious, prompting Sheila to dump Jerry, telling him she loved Neil. Neil, however, did not feel the same way and quickly dropped her, leaving the area soon after due to Emily Nugent reporting him to their boss Mr Papagopoulos for stealing from the petty cash. His exit sent Sheila into a downward spiral and she attempted suicide. Luckily Dennis Tanner rescued her and she left the Street for her parents' house. Sheila then discovered that she was pregnant and had a son, Danny, in 1964. She gave him up for adoption and eventually returned to Coronation Street, moving in with Elsie Tanner. Neil returned in 1966 and reunited with Sheila. They later married.

Walter Potts

Walter Potts was Dennis Tanner's big discovery in his short-lived career as a talent agent. Walter was a window cleaner, who Dennis was determined to turn into a singing sensation. Using the stage name Brett Falcon, he recorded a song 'Not Too Little, Not Too Much' with help from a man from Dennis's agency, Laurie Fraser. Laurie soon sacked Dennis for incompetence, and the song proved a hit. Actor Chris Sandford even got the song to No. 17 in the charts in the real world.

Myra Booth

Myra Booth (née Dickenson) was the wife of Jerry Booth. Typist Myra stunned Jerry by planning their wedding just two weeks after they had met, and Jerry got too carried away with the idea to stop it. They married on 19 October 1963, and moved into number 13 after a brief honeymoon. Jerry and Myra had money troubles due to taking on a mortgage in the purchase on their house, and Myra, who'd been handling the finances, had got the couple into debt. After Myra became pregnant and gave up her job at Gamma Garments, their only choice was to sell the house, and the Booths moved away. Myra returned in 1968 to seek a reconciliation with Jerry but it was not to be, and they were divorced only days later.

George Dickenson

George Dickenson was the over-protective father of Myra Booth, who turned up several times to sort out their problems, both personally and financially.

Laurie Fraser

Laurie Fraser was a friend of Lenny Phillips, the owner of the theatrical agency of which Dennis Tanner was a representative. Laurie knew the business far more than Dennis, and made Dennis' only hope Walter Potts his own project instead. Elsie Tanner fell for Laurie, but the romance never lasted when Elsie discovered Laurie was married.

Dave Robbins

Dave Robbins was a colleague of Ken Barlow's, who moved into number 9 with Ken and his wife Valerie as lodger when he needed a place to stay. Valerie resented having to share her home, and had him move into the flat above Frank's DIY shop. When young Susan Schofield was knocked down and killed on Rosamund Street, in the exact spot Ken and Dave had been petitioning for a children's crossing, Dave broke down. While Ken took advantage of the situation by appearing on television to debate with a local councillor, Valerie felt compelled to comfort Dave. Valerie began to question her marriage to Ken and she fell deeper for Dave, with the situation coming to a head when Val packed her bags and left, only to turn up on Dave's doorstep. She felt humiliated when Dave turned her down and she was forced to call Ken to take her home. Dave left the flat soon after when Frank sold the property.

Others

1963
, Coronation Street
Coronation Street